Olav Viksmo-Slettan (born Tolga) is a Norwegian radio and television reporter for the Norwegian Broadcasting Corporation.

Starting his radio career for Radio Vest, he later worked as program director for the television series Reparatørene and Sommer-Lørdag, as well as presenter and reporter for the radio programs Reiseradioen and Nitimen. In 2000, together with Børge Ousland, he was one of the first persons to live broadcast a North Pole-expedition. From 2010 to 2019 he functioned as NRK's commentator for the international music competition Eurovision Song Contest.

In addition to working in the media, Viksmo-Slettan is also an author, and has written several books.

Bibliography 
 Du skjødded iggetigg! (1999) Together with  Hans-Petter Jørgensen
 Pappa (2001)
 Reparatørene (2002)
 En fin dag for fotball (2003) Together with  Arne Scheie
 Hevnerens håndbok (2005)
 Den bemerkelsesverdige historien om  Dingo Mortmann (2006)
 Norske Blinkskudd (2008)

References 

Norwegian non-fiction writers
Norwegian television presenters
Norwegian television producers
Norwegian radio presenters
NRK people
People from Tolga, Norway
1965 births
Living people